Ser Humano!! (English: Human Being!!) is the debut studio album by Chilean hip-hop group Tiro de Gracia, released on 1997 through EMI Odeon. It was produced by Camilo Cintolesi and Patricio "Adonai" Loaiza, both members of the group, and Gaston "Cenzi" Gabarro, member of Chilean hip-hop group Makiza, the album features appearances from Camilo "Tea Time" Castaldi and Cristian "C-Funk" Moraga from Chilean band Los Tetas, Pedro Foncea, Quique Neira, Ema Pinto and Joe Vasconcellos. The project was recorded at Kostantinopla Studios in Santiago, owned by Carlos Cabezas from the band Electrodomésticos. The cover features a close-up to the faces of Juan Sativo and Lenwa Dura (members of the group), and was taken by Sebastián Domínguez, manager of Makiza.

The album is considered as one of the albums that opened the door to hip-hop music in Chile, becoming one of the first releases of the genre of achieve commercial success in the country, specially with the lead single of the album, "El Juego Verdadero", one of the signature songs of the group. The Chilean edition of Rolling Stone included the album in their list of 50 Best Chilean Albums, placing it at number six.

Background
The group began with Amador Fabián Sánchez (Lenwa Dura) and Juan Salazar (Juan Sativo) while both were still teenagers during the early nineties, after several performances in different local venues as well as recording demos independently, they appeared in a national hip-hop television program that gave them the exposure to start a more professional career, later they would include Juan Lagos (Zaturno) into the group alongside Camilo Cintolesi and Patricio "Adonai" Loaiza, the latter two being the producers of the album, following the recording of more demos, the group was signed to EMI and eventually released their debut album in 1997. About the recording of the album, Juan Sativo said "it was a very hard job of designing, it was a big adventure, I have the best memories from it and of the members of Tiro de Gracia".

The album spawned four singles, "El Juego Verdadero", "Melaza", "Viaje sin Rumbo" and "Chupacabras". The album's first single, "El Juego Verdadero", achieved significant radio play with very little promotion, the song would become one of the most recognizable songs by the group as well as one of the first hip-hop songs to gain such attention in Chile.

During its recording and after its release, the album faced significant censorship from radio stations and EMI, their label, the songs "María" and "Paloma Profunda", currently available in YouTube, were discarded from the album due to their allusions to marijuana. The song "Viaje sin Rumbo" was the song that sparked the most censorship out of all the songs from the album, mainly because of its lyrics mentioning abortion which was a controversial topic in Chilean society at the time, Lenwua Dura said that "Chilean music was super limited, super censored, getting to stardom was almost impossible, we were coming from a dictatorship, one that still had effect on the media, you couldn't say everything you wanted to say, when we released Ser Humano!! we were met with too many restrinctions, "Viaje sin Rumbo" was censored, it was difficult to believe that you would get too far". Despite the censorship and lack of prominent promotion, the album was highly successful, selling 60,000 copies in fifteen months from its release.

Composition
The album is composed by twenty-one tracks, sixteen songs and five interludes. It features appearances from different Chilean artists, Ema Pinto in "Ser Humano", Quique Neira in "Bebedor", as well as providing background vocals in "El Juego Verdadero", Pedro Foncea in "Corsario Universal", Joe Vasconcellos in "Leyenda Negra" and Los Tetas in "Nuestra Fiesta (Okupa, Segura y No Molesta)", specifically members Tea Time and C-Funk, Juan Sativo had previously featured in the song "Cha Cha Cha (Funky Muchacha)" by Los Tetas, which gave him exposure prior to the release of the album. All of the five interludes ("Manos Extrañas", "Como Se Siente", "Por Que Haces Esto?", "Puntos de Vista" and "Incienso Sativo") last less than ten seconds and are small excerpts from the Latin American dub of American science-fiction television series Lost in Space.

Different social issues appear through the album, the song "Viaje sin Rumbo" mentions issues like teenage pregnancy, abortion, AIDS and drug-addiction, according to Lenwa Dura, the song was inspired in part by one of his friends who was dealing with cocaine addiction. The song "Chupacabras", named after the legendary creature of the same name, is a "ridiculous explanation for the perversions of certain men during the art of seduction", containing lines such as "Amador del sexo, sangre, hambre de olor femenino, confundido como el violador de Maipú, el Chupacabras, ser ardiente, como tú y como yo" ("Lover of sex, of blood, hunger for femenine smell, confused as the rapist from Maipú, the Chupacabras, fiery being, like you and me").

Promotion
Despite the lack of traditional promotion, with the group giving few interviews and radio appearances, the album was promoted in alternative ways, during 1998, they released a parody newspaper inspired in the song "Chupacabras", as well as a comic based on the music video for "Viaje sin Rumbo", the group also released a homemade documentary film named Comienza un Nuevo Día... about the creation process of the album.

The physical versions of the album contained a nail, according to Gaspar Domínguez, the marketing manager of EMI, the nail "meant several things, the album was very sharp, it was work material from popular neighbourhoods, the nail was an element that added weight to the album, which was literally the heaviest in the market, it weighed more than other albums, in addition to the tremendous music it had, I remember we had to buy thousands of nails afterwards and hammer the round part of them so that they could enter in the box". Promotion for the album also included a series of fake threats to different media, sending anonymously a rusty nail and a telegram that said "On monday you'll receive your deserved coup de grace, the game is real" to several newspaper editors and radio directors, referencing in the message to both the name of the group (coup de grace in English) and the song "El Juego Verdadero" ("The Real Game").

Track listing
All tracks were produced by Camilo Cintolesi and Patricio "Adonai" Loaiza, with Gaston "Cenzi" Gabarro also having production credits for some songs.

Sample credits 
 "Ser Humano N°2" samples the song "Montuno Funk", written by Jim Akimoto, Jez Colin and Willie McNeil, and performed by The Solsonics.
 "El Juego Verdadero" samples the song "Just the Two of Us", written by Bill Withers and Williams Salter, and performed by Withers and Grover Washington Jr.
 "Corsario Universal" samples the song "Red Clay", written and performed by Freddie Hubbard.
 "Melaza" samples the song "Dirt in the Ground", written and performed by Tom Waits.

Reception
The album is considered as an influential album, specially to the Chilean hip-hop scene, being one of the first releases to achieve mainstream appeal and commercial success, gaining recognition outside of the underground scene, the project also marks the beginning of the career of the group as one of the main precursors of hip-hop in the country. The album was included in the list of 50 Best Chilean Albums at number 6, released by the Chilean edition of the American magazine Rolling Stone on 2008, the list was voted by several Chilean musicians and music critics.

All-time lists

Credits

Tiro de Gracia
 Patricio "Adonai" Loaiza – Drum Machine, Keyboards, Sampling, Mixing, Mastering
 Camilo Cintolesi – Guitar, Keyboards, Mixing, Mastering
 Juan "Juan Sativo" Salazar – Vocals
 Amador "Lenwa Dura" Sanchez – Vocals
 Juan "Zaturno" Lagos – Vocals

Technical
 DJ Raff – Mixing
 DJ Squat – Mixing
 Michel Durot – Assistant Engineer
 Marcelo Ulloa – Assistant Engineer
 Gastón "Cenzi" Gabarró – Composer, Guitar
 Joaquin Garcia – Mastering, Producer
 Gonzalo "Chalo" González – Engineer

Musicians
 Ema Pinto – Vocals (track 1)
 Quique Neira – Vocals (tracks 3), Composer (track 19)
 Pedro Foncea – Vocals (track 10)
 Camilo "Tea Time" Castaldi – Guitar, Keyboards (track 15)
 Cristian "C-Funk" Moraga – Keyboards, Vocals (track 15)
 Joe Vasconcellos – Percussion, Vocals (track 20)

References

1997 debut albums
Tiro de Gracia albums